Emerald Square is a shopping mall in North Attleboro, Massachusetts. The mall is anchored by JCPenney and Macy's, and features staples such as H&M, Forever 21, and Hollister.

History

Originally opened in 1989 as a joint venture of New England Development and The Pyramid Companies, Emerald Square's original anchors included JCPenney, Sears, and G. Fox., with Lechmere added in 1992.  The G. Fox store was renamed Filene's in 1993, while Lechmere was closed in 1997 as a result of chain liquidation.  Lord & Taylor bought the vacant location in 1998 and doubled the space. A carousel was installed in the food court 1999.

Meanwhile, Pyramid had sold its interest in the mall in 1998 to New England Development, which turned around and sold most of its shopping mall portfolio to a joint venture led by Simon Property Group in 1999. Lord & Taylor was repositioned and closed this location entirely in 2004. The space converted to Filene's, which had opened a separate Men's & Home store in 2005. In 2006, Filene's stores became Macy's, as well as the Home & Men's stores.

On January 29, 2021, it was announced that Sears would be closing as part of a plan to close 23 stores nationwide. The store closed on April 18, 2021. Kohan Retail Investment Group bought the mall in September 2022.

List of anchor stores

References

External links
 

Shopping malls in Massachusetts
Buildings and structures in Bristol County, Massachusetts
Tourist attractions in Bristol County, Massachusetts
1989 establishments in Massachusetts
Shopping malls established in 1989
Kohan Retail Investment Group